Orlando Graham (born May 5, 1965) is an American former professional basketball player who was selected by the Miami Heat in the second round (40th pick overall) of the 1988 NBA draft. Graham was born in Montgomery, Alabama and graduated from Sidney Lanier High School in 1984. A 6'8" forward, Graham played two seasons for Auburn University at Montgomery. He earned First-Team All-American honors and became the first Senator to win the NAIA Player of the Year Award during the 1987-88 season. Graham played in only one NBA season for the Golden State Warriors during the 1988-89 NBA season. He appeared in 7 games and scored a total of 8 points in his brief NBA career. Graham was the fifth ever draft pick in Miami Heat history. Orlando Graham was also selected as an candidate for 1988 Men's Olympic Basketball team in representing USA. Graham is one of just two former Senators to play professionally in the National Basketball Association (NBA) and one of four AUM men's basketball players to have his jersey retired.

External links
Basketballreference.com page

1965 births
Living people
American men's basketball players
Auburn Montgomery Warhawks men's basketball players
Basketball players from Montgomery, Alabama
Cholet Basket players
Cedar Rapids Silver Bullets players
Columbus Horizon players
Forwards (basketball)
Golden State Warriors players
Miami Heat draft picks
Quad City Thunder players
Rapid City Thrillers players
Sidney Lanier High School alumni
Tulsa Fast Breakers players
West Texas A&M Buffaloes basketball players